John Robert Kline (December 7, 1891 – May 2, 1955) was an American mathematician and educator.

One of three children born to Henry K. Kline (1862–1923) and Emma M. Kline (1869–1948), he was Professor of mathematics at the University of Pennsylvania from 1920–1955. A Ph.D. student of Robert Lee Moore, he was a Guggenheim Fellow in 1925, later Chairman of the Department of Mathematics from 1933–1954, and Thomas A. Scott Professor of Mathematics from 1941–1955.

His doctoral students include Lida Barrett, Arthur Milgram, Athanasios Papoulis, Dudley Weldon Woodard, Leo Zippin, and William Waldron Schieffelin Claytor.

Partial bibliography

References

External links

1891 births
1955 deaths
People from Quakertown, Pennsylvania
University of Pennsylvania faculty
Mathematicians at the University of Pennsylvania
20th-century American mathematicians